Pest-Pilis-Solt-Kiskun is the name of an administrative county (comitatus) of the Kingdom of Hungary. Its territory is now in central Hungary, comprising the territory of the present Hungarian county Pest and the northern part of present Bács-Kiskun county. The capital of the county was Budapest.

Geography
Pest-Pilis-Solt-Kiskun county shared borders with the counties Komárom, Esztergom, Hont, Nógrád, Heves, Jász-Nagykun-Szolnok, Csongrád, Bács-Bodrog, Tolna and Fejér. Its territory covered the eastern bank of the river Danube from Visegrád in the north to (excluding) Baja in the south, stretching to the river Tisza in the east. A part of the county (Pilis) was on the west bank of the Danube, near Budapest. Its area was 12,228 km² around 1910.

History
The counties Pest and Pilis were formed in the 11th century. Pest was the area on the left (east) bank of the Danube around present-day Budapest, Pilis was on the opposite bank. They were united and became the political, cultural and economical centre of Hungary. The Solt region (the left bank of the Danube south of Ráckeve), which previously belonged to Fejér county, was incorporated in Pest-Pilis-Solt county in the 17th century. Kiskunság (Little Cumania) was added in 1876, creating Pest-Pilis-Solt-Kiskun county.

After World War II the county was split in two roughly equal parts. The northern part became Pest county, the southern part merged with Bács-Bodrog county to form Bács-Kiskun county.

Demographics

1900
In 1900, the county had a population of 1,615,729 people and was composed of the following linguistic communities:

Total:

 Hungarian: 1,317,237 (81,5%)
 German: 201,285 (12,4%)
 Slovak: 58,533 (3,6%)
 Serbian: 6,199 (0,4%)
 Croatian: 2,372 (0,2%)
 Romanian: 1,664 (0,1%)
 Ruthenian: 234 (0,0%)
 Other or unknown: 28,205 (1,8%)

According to the census of 1900, the county was composed of the following religious communities:

Total:

 Roman Catholic: 1,046,868 (64,8%)
 Calvinist: 252,188 (15,6%)
 Jewish: 201,117 (12,5%)
 Lutheran: 96,863 (6,0%)
 Greek Orthodox: 8,563 (0,5%)
 Greek Catholic: 6,949 (0,4%)
 Unitarian: 1,219 (0,0%)
 Other or unknown: 1,962(0,1%)

1910
In 1910, the county had a population of 1,978,041 people and was composed of the following linguistic communities:

 Hungarian: 1,728,473 (87,4%)
 German: 162,824 (8,2%)
 Slovak: 47,149 (2,4%)
 Serbian: 7,934 (0,4%)
 Croatian: 3,419 (0,2%)
 Romanian: 3,357 (0,2%)
 Ruthenian: 306 (0,0%)
 Other or unknown: 24,579 (1,2%)

According to the census of 1910, the county was composed of the following religious communities:

Total:

 Roman Catholic: 1,293,265 (65,4%)
 Calvinist: 296,223 (15,0%)
 Jewish: 245,157 (12,4%)
 Lutheran: 113,094 (5,7%)
 Greek Catholic: 12,169 (0,6%)
 Greek Orthodox: 12,001 (0,6%)
 Unitarian: 2,526 (0,1%)
 Other or unknown: 3,606 (0,2%)

Subdivisions
Before approx. 1897, the subdivisions of Pest-Pilis-Solt-Kiskun were (felső is upper, közép is middle, alsó is lower):

After approx. 1897, the subdivisions of Pest-Pilis-Solt-Kiskun were:

References

States and territories disestablished in 1950
Counties in the Kingdom of Hungary